On 5 December 2017, Michael I of Romania, former head of the House of Romania and former King of Romania from 1927 to 1930 and 1940 to 1947, died at his private residence in Switzerland at the age of 96, in the presence of his youngest daughter Princess Maria.

On Wednesday, 13 December 2017, at 11:00 am, King Michael I's coffin, draped by his Royal Standard, was brought back to Romania, arriving at the Otopeni Airport in Bucharest from Lausanne, via Payerne Air Base, escorted by his second daughter, Princess Elena with her husband Alexander Nixon, fourth daughter Princess Sophie and also members of the Royal Household, were transported by the Romanian Air Force's Alenia C-27J Spartan Military Plane, which was flanked by four Mikoyan-Gurevich MiG-21 Military Combat Jets.

The coffin was first taken to Peleș Castle at Sinaia in the Carpathian Mountains. Then, it was brought to Bucharest, where it was laid and displayed at the Royal Palace for two days. King Michael I was buried on 16 December with full state honours in the Mausoleum of the Royal Family, on the grounds of the Curtea de Argeș Cathedral together his wife Queen Anne who died in 2016.

The funeral ceremony was led by Patriarch Daniel of Romania. Queen Anne-Marie, her son Prince Nikolaos of Greece and Denmark and sister-in-law, Princess Irene of Greece and Denmark;, Princess Astrid and Prince Lorenz of Belgium. Also, important Romanian politicians, such as Klaus Iohannis, Liviu Dragnea, Călin Popescu-Tăriceanu, Mihai Tudose, Gabriela Firea, Victor Ponta, Ludovic Orban, Dacian Cioloș, Adrian Năstase, Vasile Dîncu or Victor Ciorbea, participated in the funeral or expressed their condolences. A delegation of Moldovan politicians, led by Andrian Candu, also attended the funeral. Candu also proposed for 16 December to be declared national mourning day in Moldova, but President Igor Dodon refused, arguing that "King Michael led another state".

His body was transferred from Bucharest to Curtea de Argeș with the help of a funeral train, the Royal Train, and a repainted domestic-traffic carriage, being led by a diesel locomotive. His funeral is stated to have been one of the largest in Romania, with almost a million Romanians flocking to the capital to pay their respects and watch the funeral, with it being comparable to the one of Corneliu Coposu in 1995.

Days of 14, 15 and 16 December were declared as national mourning days.

A copy of the Steel Crown of Romania was placed on the coffin of the late king during the funeral.

Guests

Romania

Immediate family

 Margareta, Custodian of the Crown of Romania and Prince Radu, The King’s eldest daughter and her husband
 Princess Elena and The Hon. Alexander Nixon, The King’s second daughter and her husband.
 The Hon. Nicolae de Roumanie-Medforth-Mills and The Hon. Alina de Roumanie-Medforth-Mills, The King’s grandson and granddaughter-in-law
 The Hon. Elisabeta-Karina de Roumanie-Medforth-Mills, The King’s granddaughter
 Princess Irina, The King’s third daughter
 Princess Sophie, The King’s fourth daughter
 Princess Maria, The King’s youngest daughter

Foreign

Royalty

 Crown Prince Leka and Crown Princess Elia
 Karl, Archduke of Austria
 Archduke Georg of Austria
  Prince Rashid bin Khalifa Al Khalifa
  Princess Astrid, Archduchess of Austria-Este and Prince Lorenz, Archduke of Austria-Este
 Tsar Simeon II of Bulgaria
 Georg Friedrich, Prince of Prussia
 The Margrave and Margravine of Baden
 The Duke of Bavaria
 Duke Eberhard of Württemberg
 Queen Anne-Marie of Greece
 Prince Nikolaos of Greece and Denmark
 Princess Irene of Greece and Denmark
 Prince Emanuele Filiberto of Savoy
  Princess Muna al-Hussein
  Princess Isabelle, Princess Philipp of Liechtenstein
  The Grand Duke of Luxembourg
 Duarte Pio, Duke of Braganza
 Maria Vladimirovna, Grand Duchess of Russia
 Crown Prince Alexander and Crown Princess Katherine of Yugoslavia
  King Juan Carlos I and Queen Sofia of Spain
  The King and Queen of Sweden
  The Prince of Wales

Nobility
 Princess Tatiana Radziwiłł
 Princess Anne of Ligne

Gallery

See also
 Monarchism in Romania

References

Death and funeral of Michael I
Funerals in Romania
State funerals
Funerals by person